Désiré Lacroix (18 December 1927 – 23 September 2013) was a French alpine skier. He competed in the men's slalom at the 1948 Winter Olympics.

References

External links
 

1927 births
2013 deaths
French male alpine skiers
Olympic alpine skiers of France
Alpine skiers at the 1948 Winter Olympics
Sportspeople from Jura (department)
20th-century French people